Nickelodeon is an Arabic pay television channel for kids that is exclusively available on Emirati satellite provider OSN. It is the official Arabic-localised variant of Nickelodeon and until 2011, it was the last remaining channel to retain the 'splat' logo that was used from 1984 to 2009 in the United States.

History

Nickelodeon's pan-Asian feed was initially launched in the Middle East on 16 July 1996 on Showtime Arabia, although at the time it was solely available in English. A standalone feed for Middle Eastern audiences was launched on 23 July 2008 with Arabic and English audio tracks. Nickelodeon was the first international children's television network to establish an Arabic language service.

It was the second channel in the joint venture between Viacom International Media Networks and Arabian Television Network, part of Arab Media Group, the largest media group in the United Arab Emirates, after the successful launch for MTV Arabia (later known as MTV Middle East). The website was nickarabia.net.

By 2011, it was the only Nickelodeon channel worldwide that had not changed its logo from the orange splat to the orange text after the mother company's 2009 rebrand. Since late 2010, the channel had been suffering a frozen broadcast, broadcasting its usual programmes repetitively without any evidence of upcoming updates. Its official website went down, and there were no clear indications or citations for why the channel was being heavily neglected, albeit oddly remaining live for the time being. Regardless, the channel remained live for many months into 2011.  A similar situation was happening with its sister channel MTV Arabia.

On 8 September 2011, at one minute past midnight in U.A.E. time, and without a mainstream warning, the channel closed and went on an indefinite hiatus without any explanation. The broadcast signal initially displayed a static message indicating Nickelodeon Arabia's viewers to continue watching Nickelodeon programmes via the Nickelodeon block on MBC 3. The signal then reverted to a casual test card a few days later, and the channel was de-listed by various satellite television providers before the signal itself disappeared completely.

On 17 December 2014, it was announced that Viacom International Media Networks would launch a related feed of Nickelodeon Arabia (also in HD) on the Dubai-based pay-TV service OSN, along with a Nick Jr. channel. Both channels launched on 5 January 2015 in Arabic only, but later launched an additional English audio track in February 2015. A dedicated Nickelodeon website, social media accounts and an exclusive Nick app were launched.

In 2018, Viacom merged official websites of Southeast Asian, Middle Eastern and African versions of Nickelodeon into nick.tv.

Related channels

Nick Jr. 

Nick Jr. is a satellite channel for Arab kids that airs Nick Jr. pre-school shows dubbed in Arabic. The channel launched on January 5, 2015, at 10:00 am on OSN along with Nickelodeon Arabia. It also has an English audio.

NickToons 

Nicktoons is a satellite channel for Arab kids that airs animated Nickelodeon shows dubbed in Arabic. It airs reruns of old Nickelodeon programming in Arabic. The channel launched on February 15, 2017, on OSN.

Nicktoons Arabia uses Nicktoons UK & Ireland's 2014 on-air broadcast design package produced by "Beautiful Creative". It also has an English audio.

TeenNick 

TeenNick is a video on demand channel for Arab kids that airs Nickelodeon's live-action TV series. It airs reruns of old and new Nickelodeon programming in English with Arabic subtitles. The channel launched on April 15, 2017, on OSN PLAY.

Programming 
The animated shows currently airing on Nickelodeon Arabia are in Arabic and English. The live-action TeenNick shows originally aired in English with Arabic subtitles. However, original social shows produced by Nickelodeon Arabia's own studio, such as Shoof Kids and Jamaatna, were also in Arabic.

Most of the network shows were outdated, older series at the time that have already been cancelled or have ended before their debut, with the exception of SpongeBob SquarePants, although they are considered fairly never-before-seen by most of the Arab audience at one time, in either their English or Arabic formats. There were even several series yet to debut on Nickelodeon Arabia, with exception of The Fairly OddParents, which apparently already settled on Disney Channel Arabia in 2006, and settled on Nicktoons Arabia years later in 2017. Fairly OddParents characters would appear in activity segments from Nickelodeon Magazine cutouts.

Like most Arab channels, Nickelodeon was subject to censorship, but this is by far limited to simply scenes of French kissing, although any mention of said kisses are retained. This was similar to the censorship on MTV Arabia, but after the relaunch, there is no censorship.

In 2018, Nickelodeon Arabia premiered the Nick India original, Motu Patlu.

Original programming on Nickelodeon's older Channel

Catch Match
Catch Match (كاتش ماتش) was an original show for Nickelodeon Arabia that was renewed every holy month of Ramadan. It was a kids' game show that had two opposing teams compete in a variety of physical challenges to gain the most points. This show was hosted by the announcer Taj Aser, and was filmed on location in Jeddah.

Shoof Kids 
Shoof Kids was an original show that featured home-made videos sent in by viewers.

References

External links 
Official Arabic website
Official English website
Official YouTube Channel

Arabia
Arabic-language television stations
Children's television networks
Television channels and stations disestablished in 2011
Television channels and stations established in 2015
Television channels and stations established in 2008
Television stations in the United Arab Emirates
Television stations in Saudi Arabia
Television stations in Egypt
Television channels in Jordan
Television stations in Libya
Television stations in Lebanon
Television stations in Iraq
Television stations in Algeria
Television stations in Tunisia
Television stations in Kuwait
Television stations in Morocco
Television stations in the State of Palestine
Television channels in Syria
Television stations in Yemen
Re-established companies
Television channels in Mauritania
1996 establishments in Asia
1996 establishments in Africa